Long Valley (also Longvalley) is an unincorporated community in Jackson County, South Dakota, United States. Long Valley has been assigned the ZIP code of 57547.

The town site is located in a long valley.

Notes

Unincorporated communities in Jackson County, South Dakota
Unincorporated communities in South Dakota